Mary Childs is an American financial journalist, and non-fiction writer. She is  co-hosted for Planet Money.

She graduated from Washington and Lee University. She reported for Barron’s, the Financial Times, and Bloomberg News.

Works 

 The Bond King Flatiron Books, 2022.

References

External links 

 Official website

American journalists